White Hair Devil Lady, also known as Sorceress' Wrath, is a 1980 Hong Kong film adapted from Liang Yusheng's novel Baifa Monü Zhuan. The film was directed by Chang Hsin-yen and starred Paw Hee-ching and Henry Fong.

Cast
Paw Hee-ching as Lin Ngai-seung
Henry Fong as Cheuk Yat-hong
Leanne Liu as Tit San-wu
Chiang Han as Muk-yung Chung
Ping Fan as Tit Fei-lung
Cheung Ping as Ngok Ming-or
Mo Yau-ming
Wong Yeung
Lau Wan-fung
Leung Hang
Leung Hang
Hau Pui-man
Chan Tsung
Tsui Lik
Lam Tit-ching
Chan Kwok-kuen
Chik Ngai-hung

External links

1980 films
Hong Kong martial arts films
1980s Cantonese-language films
Wuxia films
Works based on Baifa Monü Zhuan
Films based on Baifa Monü Zhuan
1980s Hong Kong films